The Pyeongsan Sin clan or Pyeongsan Shin clan is one of the great aristocratic houses which originated from Korea. The clan was key in the foundation of the Goryeo dynasty and gained its power during this time. However, it became less prominent during the following Joseon dynasty.

Not all Koreans with the family name Sin belong to the Pyeongsan Sin clan; only about 600,000 (about 70%) hail from this clan. Others belong to other unrelated clans, such as the Goryeong Sin clan, who produced 19th and 20th century notables as Sin Chaeho.

Clan history during the Goryeo period (918-1392)
The Pyeongsan Sin clan is a Korean noble family, which took its root during the 10th century, at the time of the foundation of the Goryeo Dynasty. At the beginning of the Goryeo period, the country was divided in several kingdoms fighting for supremacy over the peninsula.

The founder of the clan is generally accepted to be General Sin Sung-gyeom, who helped Wang Geon found the kingdom by dethroning the tyrant Gung Ye, alongside Hyeon Gyeong, Hong Yu, and Bok Ji-geom in 918.

As described on an official description plate at his memorial shrine in the province of Gangwon, Sin Sung-gyeom died around 927 in a battle in present-day Daegu, fighting bravely to save Wang Geon (also referred to as King Taejo), while dressed in the King's clothes. After his death, the King bestowed upon Sin's son and Sin's brother the high aristocratic title of Jangjolgong.

According to the legend, the clan name of Pyeongsan Sin was given to Sin Sung-gyeom before his death, during a hunting trip with Wang Geon. A skillful archer, Sin successfully hit "the left wing of the third goose among the flying geese". Wang Geon was impressed and bestowed Sin with the land area, Pyeongsan, over which the geese had been flying, hence the family line originated there. The area is currently situated in the North Korean province of Hwanghae.

Clan history during the Joseon period (1392-1910)
During the Joseon era, the Pyeongsan Sin family developed into one of many yangban families. As other yangban of the time, members of the Pyeongsan Sin clan successfully passed the gwageo, or the national civil service examinations. There was no hereditary aristocracy in Korea during the Joseon era, as the bureaucracy was filled by tested and certified professionals. Having peaked during the Goryeo era, the Pyeongsan Sin clan produced fewer individuals of national prominence during this era.

References

Further reading
Lee Ki-baik. A New History of Korea. Harvard University Press, 1984.